Knik River  is a census-designated place (CDP) in Matanuska-Susitna Borough in the U.S. state of Alaska. Located 15 miles southeast from Palmer along the Knik River, it is part of the Anchorage, Alaska Metropolitan Statistical Area. The population was 792 at the 2020 census, up from 744 in 2010.

Geography and climate
Knik River is located at  (61.470970, -148.86064) (Sec. 24, T016N, R003W, Seward Meridian), in the Palmer Recording District.

The community has developed along the south bank of the Knik River, which flows into Knik Arm, at the southern border of the Mat-Su Borough. It lies along the Old Glenn Highway and Knik River Road.

Climate
The temperatures in January range from -35 °F (-37 °C) to 33 °F (1 °C); in July, 72 °F (6 °C) to 85 °F (29 °C). Annual precipitation is 16.5 inches (42 cm), including 43 inches (109 cm) of snowfall.

History
The Knik (Arm area) or K′enah Ht’ana regional band of Dena'ina Athabascans were the earliest inhabitants of the region. They traveled through the area on a winter trail from Eklutna up the Knik River to the Copper River. The Palmer Road, now the Old Glenn Highway, was built through the area to Palmer in 1942. A lodge on Goat Creek was popular with travelers. The Eklutna Power Project was also built in the 1940s, including tract housing for employees. Knik River Road started as a logging road in the early 1950s; a gravel road was built in the late 1960s. The road is now paved up to Hunter Creek.

Demographics

Knik River first appeared on the 2000 U.S. Census as a census-designated place (CDP).

As of the census of 2000, there were 582 people, 216 households, and 147 families residing in the CDP.  The population density was 6.4 people per square mile (2.5/km2).  There were 263 housing units at an average density of 2.9/sq mi (1.1/km2).  The racial makeup of the CDP was 85.74% White, 0.17% Black or African American, 6.70% Native American, 0.86% Pacific Islander, 1.37% from other races, and 5.15% from two or more races.  2.58% of the population were Hispanic or Latino of any race.

There were 216 households, out of which 38.9% had children under the age of 18 living with them, 57.9% were married couples living together, 5.1% had a female householder with no husband present, and 31.5% were non-families. 24.1% of all households were made up of individuals, and 4.2% had someone living alone who was 65 years of age or older.  The average household size was 2.69 and the average family size was 3.22.

In the CDP, the population was spread out, with 31.3% under the age of 18, 5.3% from 18 to 24, 35.4% from 25 to 44, 23.7% from 45 to 64, and 4.3% who were 65 years of age or older.  The median age was 36 years. For every 100 females, there were 108.6 males.  For every 100 females age 18 and over, there were 119.8 males.

The median income for a household in the CDP was $55,000, and the median income for a family was $55,000. Males had a median income of $36,071 versus $27,143 for females. The per capita income for the CDP was $19,104.  About 19.7% of families and 15.3% of the population were below the poverty line, including 23.8% of those under age 18 and none of those age 65 or over.

Public services
Most homes use individual wells and septic systems. There are a few private piped systems; some residents haul water and use outhouses. The Eklutna Power Project is located in the community. The Borough provides a refuse transfer site in Butte. Electricity is provided by Matanuska Electric Association. There are no state operated schools located in the community. Local hospitals or health clinics include Valley Hospital in Palmer (746-8600) or Anchorage hospitals.  Auxiliary health care is provided by Butte Ambulance Service (373-8800/745-4811), Anchorage or Palmer hospitals.

Economy and transportation
Many residents are employed in Anchorage or the Palmer/Wasilla area in a variety of positions in the private and public sectors. Retail trade, transportation, and education are the primary employers.

Knik River lies off the Glenn Highway. Many forms of transportation are available in nearby Palmer and Anchorage.

Taxes
Sales: None, Property: 11.483 mills (Borough), Special: 5% Accommodations Tax (Borough)

In popular culture
Jessie Arnold, fictional Iditarod musher and protagonist of a series of murder mysteries by author Sue Henry, lives outside of the city of Palmer in the Knik River valley.
The river is featured in the program I Shouldn't Be Alive, Season 6, Episode 4: Escape From Bear Mountain.

References

External links
 State of Alaska, Division of Community Advocacy, Community Information Summary

Census-designated places in Alaska
Census-designated places in Matanuska-Susitna Borough, Alaska
Anchorage metropolitan area
Denaʼina